Gong Min-ji (born January 18, 1994), better known by her stage name Minzy, is a South Korean singer, rapper, and dancer. She debuted in 2009 as a member of South Korean girl group 2NE1, which became one of the best-selling girl groups worldwide before her departure in April 2016. She released her first solo EP, Minzy Work 01: "Uno", in April 2017. On November 20, 2020, Minzy made her debut in the Philippines with the Tagalog version of her  single "Lovely".

Early life
Minzy was born in Seoul, South Korea on January 18, 1994. She is the granddaughter of folk dancer Gong Ok-jin. When she was young, she moved to Gwangju with her family, but then her mother brought Minzy and her sister back to Seoul while traveling between Seoul and Gwangju to work with Minzy's father. She participated in many dance contests and competitions, winning various awards. A video of her at a dance competition in Gwangju was uploaded onto the Internet and became popular with many people sending praise for her ability to dance. This video was then uploaded onto YG's homepage, whereupon the CEO, Yang Hyun-suk, contacted and recruited her to join the agency when she was only in sixth grade.

Career

2009–2016: 2NE1

YG Entertainment stated in early 2009 that they would be debuting a new four-member group that had been training for four years and that their debut album would contain songs produced by 1TYM's leader Teddy Park and G-Dragon of Big Bang. The group's name was initially announced as "21"; however, due to the discovery of a singer with the same name, the group was renamed "2NE1", with "NE" being an abbreviation of "New Evolution". Minzy was placed in 2NE1 as the main dancer, alongside Park Bom, Sandara Park and CL. The group went on to debut with their first single "Fire" in May 2009, with Minzy being the youngest member at just 15 years old.

In October 2015, while 2NE1 was on hiatus, Minzy founded her own dance studio named the "Millennium Dance Academy" as a personal project, unconnected to YG Entertainment. The studio is based in Seoul, South Korea.

Minzy officially left the group and the group's agency, YG Entertainment, on April 5, 2016. Because of this, she did not take part in 2NE1's last song 
"Goodbye", released on January 21, 2017.

2016–present: Solo career and MZ Entertainment
In May 2016, Minzy signed with CJ E&M's subsidiary label Music Works.
It was revealed that Minzy is currently preparing for her solo album and is interested in trying out different types of music and doesn't want to limit herself to one specific genre. Music Works stated, "We are focusing on producing a first solo album which can portray all of Gong Minzy's talent and potential. We will continue the preparations without being chased by time".

On January 17, 2017, a representative from KBS revealed that Minzy has been confirmed as a cast member of the second season of Sister's Slam Dunk together with Kim Sook, Hong Jin-kyung, Kang Ye-won, Han Chae-young, Hong Jin-young and Jeon So-mi. The show aired its first broadcast on February 10, where Minzy was appointed to become the main singer, main dancer, dance tutor, and choreographer for the second generation of Unnies by legendary producer and composer Kim Hyung Suk (mentor of JYP), and was voted as leader of the group on the third episode. She is also qualified to be the team's rap teacher, but due to her heavy workload, the role went to LA-born newcomer KillaGramz. In episode 12, she was named the rapping director as Kim Hyung Suk has no rapping knowledge, and named Hong Jin-young as the sole rapper of the group, with Jeon So-mi the rap lyricist for "Right?". In March 2017, Minzy released her first solo single, "I Wanted To Love" as the soundtrack of the MBC drama The Rebel

On April 17, 2017, Minzy released her solo debut EP, Minzy Work 01. "Uno", along with title track "Ninano". The EP debuted at number 2 on the Billboard World Albums Chart as the highest-ranking debut before it fell to number 9 in the second week. On September 28, Minzy announced she would go on tour in North America, however the tour got postponed and then cancelled due to her working on new music. On December 1, 2018, Minzy released her first English language solo single, "All of You Say".

On April 17, 2020, Minzy left Music Works after her legal dispute was settled. On May 24, 2020, Minzy released her single "Lovely", her first released as an independent artist. In October 2020, Minzy founded her own company MZ Entertainment and will carry out her future activities on her future agency. A month later, Minzy signed with Viva Entertainment for her musical activities in the Philippines. She released the Tagalog version of her single "Lovely" on November 20, 2020.

On June 6, 2021, MZ Entertainment announced that Minzy is planning for a comeback with a new single in July.  The new single, titled "Teamo", was released on July 11. On December 12, 2021, Minzy released her new single "Fantabulous".

Personal life
In August 2017, Minzy graduated from Baekseok University magna cum laude from the Department of Theology.

Discography

Extended plays

Singles

Soundtrack appearances

Filmography

Film

Television shows

Web shows

Awards and nominations

Notes

References

External links 

 

1994 births
Living people
People from Seoul
Singers from Seoul
Rappers from Seoul
South Korean Christians
South Korean dance musicians
South Korean female idols
South Korean women pop singers
21st-century South Korean singers
21st-century South Korean women singers
South Korean child singers
2NE1 members
Viva Records (Philippines) artists
Viva Artists Agency